Kevin Joseph "KJ" Sawka is an American musician, record producer, and DJ. He plays drums in the bands Pendulum and Destroid.

Career 
KJ Sawka started his musical career at the age of twelve. At age eighteen, he developed an interest in electronic music and started producing. Citing the drumming of Phil Collins as a major influence, Sawka uses a customized drumkit configured to enable greater improvisation, tailored to the type of music he is playing. In the studio, he favors electronic drum machines, while for live performances he primarily plays drums.

In 2010 he became the drummer of Pendulum as the sole American member, appearing on their Immersion album. The group reunited in 2016 for a single live show at Ultra Music Festival, Miami, and subsequently went on tour in 2017.

In 2012, together with producers Excision and Downlink, Sawka founded the supergroup Destroid, of which he is the drummer.

He founded the independent record label Impossible Records in 2015.

Sawka currently endorses Tama, Meinl, Evans, Vater, Hammerax, Roland and Izotope.

In 2021, Sawka reunited with friend and collaborator, Blake Lewis, to form the group, "The Private Language". Their first single, a cover of the Tears for Fears classic, "Everybody Wants to Rule the World" was released on Black Hole Recordings and was shortly followed up by the release of their second single, "Cali Girls".

Discography

Solo 
Studio albums
 2005 – Synchronized Decompression
 2007 – Cyclonic Steel
 2009 – Undefined Connectivity

Live albums
 2008 – Live at Chop Suey

With Pendulum 
 2010 – Immersion

With Destroid 
 2013 – The Invasion
 2014 – The Invasion Remixes

References

External links 
 
 
 Interview with KJ Sawka at Only the Beat

Living people
American dance musicians
American DJs
Drum and bass musicians
People from Seattle
Pendulum (drum and bass band) members
Electronic dance music DJs
1977 births